Edgar Ramey Wingard (September 21, 1878 – July 31, 1927) was an American football, basketball, and baseball coach and college athletics administrator. He served as the head football coach at seven different schools: Ohio Northern University (1903), Butler University (1904–1905), Western University of Pennsylvania—now known as the University of Pittsburgh (1906), Louisiana State University (1907–1908), the University of Maine (1910–1911), Susquehanna University (1916–1917, 1919, 1924–1925), and Bucknell University (1918), compiling a career record of 74–38–6. In 1908, Wingard led his LSU team to a record of 10–0. The team has been recognized as a national champion by the National Championship Foundation, although LSU does not officially claim a national title that season. Wingard was the head coach of the basketball team at Butler from 1904 to 1906 and the head coach of the first LSU Tigers basketball team during the 1908–09 season. He coached the LSU Tigers baseball team in 1908 and 1909 and the baseball team at Maine in 1911. Wingard also coached the LSU Tigers track and field team from 1907 to 1909.

Wingard died of a cerebral hemorrhage in the summer of 1927 at a hospital in Selinsgrove, Pennsylvania.

Head coaching record

Football

Basketball

Baseball

References

1878 births
1927 deaths
Baseball coaches from Pennsylvania
Basketball coaches from Pennsylvania
College men's basketball head coaches in the United States
College track and field coaches in the United States
Bucknell Bison football coaches
Butler Bulldogs football coaches
Butler Bulldogs men's basketball coaches
Carlisle Indians football coaches
LSU Tigers baseball coaches
LSU Tigers basketball coaches
LSU Tigers football coaches
LSU Tigers and Lady Tigers track and field coaches
Maine Black Bears athletic directors
Maine Black Bears baseball coaches
Maine Black Bears football coaches
Ohio Northern Polar Bears football coaches
Pittsburgh Panthers football coaches
Susquehanna River Hawks football coaches
Susquehanna River Hawks men's basketball coaches